Mike Ekeler (born October 4, 1971) is an American football coach who is currently the special teams coordinator and outside linebackers coach for the Tennessee Volunteers.

College career
Ekeler played at Kansas State where he was a linebacker and special teams standout.

Coaching career
On January 31, 2020,  Ekeler was hired as the special teams coordinator at North Texas.

References

External links
 North Texas profile
 Indiana profile
 Nebraska profile

Further reading
 
 
 
 
 
 
 
 Mike Ekeler Discusses His Special Teams Philosophy, Decision to Become a ST Coordinator, and More Sports Illustrated
 Mike Ekeler is ready to bring the energy to Tennessee football

1971 births
Living people
People from David City, Nebraska
Players of American football from Nebraska
American football linebackers
Kansas State Wildcats football players
Coaches of American football from Nebraska
Oklahoma Sooners football coaches
LSU Tigers football coaches
Nebraska Cornhuskers football coaches
Indiana Hoosiers football coaches
USC Trojans football coaches
Georgia Bulldogs football coaches
North Texas Mean Green football coaches
North Carolina Tar Heels football coaches
Kansas Jayhawks football coaches
Tennessee Volunteers football coaches